Justice Ravi Ranjan (born 20 December 1960) is an Indian Judge. He is former Chief Justice of Jharkhand High Court and Judge of Punjab and Haryana High Court and Patna High Court.

Career
Ravi Ranjan was born in a Bhumihar Brahmin family in 1960 at Patna. He passed M.Sc. in geology from Patna University, and LL.B. from Patna Law College in 1989. He was awarded Ph.D. in geology from Patna University. He joined Civil Engineering Department of the Bihar College of Engineering as a part-time Lecturer. After completion of LL.B., Ranjan joined Patna High Court for legal practice. He was appointed by Union of India as Senior Standing Counsel on 26 June 2004. On 14 July 2008 Ranjan was elevated as an Additional Judge of Patna High Court. He became the permanent Judge on 16 January 2010. He was appointed the Chief Justice of High Court of Jharkhand on 17 November 2019. He was retired on 19 December 2022.

References 

Judges of the Punjab and Haryana High Court
People from Patna
Patna University alumni
Judges of the Patna High Court
1960 births
Living people
Chief Justices of the Jharkhand High Court